The common hepatic artery is a short blood vessel that supplies oxygenated blood to the liver, pylorus of the stomach, duodenum, pancreas, and gallbladder.

It arises from the celiac artery and has the following branches:

Additional images

References

External links
  - "Stomach, Spleen and Liver: Contents of the Hepatoduodenal ligament"
 

Arteries of the abdomen